General visceral fibers may refer to:

 General visceral afferent fibers
 General visceral efferent fibers